Bon Gowd (also Romanized as Bon-e Gowd and Bongowd) is a village in Howmeh Rural District, in the Central District of Kahnuj County, Kerman Province, Iran. At the 2006 census, its population was 60, in 12 families.

References 

Populated places in Kahnuj County